The  was the first successful Japanese-designed and constructed airplane. It was designed by Captain Yoshitoshi Tokugawa and was first flown by him on October 13, 1911 at Tokorozawa in Saitama Prefecture.

There is a replica displayed in the Tokorozawa Aviation Museum, located near the place where the aircraft's first flight took place.

Specifications

References

External links

Pusher aircraft
Rotary-engined aircraft
Biplanes
Aircraft first flown in 1911